Players and pairs who neither have high enough rankings nor receive wild cards may participate in a qualifying tournament held one week before the annual Wimbledon Tennis Championships.

Seeds

  Jeff Coetzee /  Tuomas Ketola (second round)
  Maurice Ruah /  André Sá (first round)
  Adam Peterson /  Chris Tontz (second round)
  Thomas Shimada /  Myles Wakefield (second round)
  Adriano Ferreira /  Gouichi Motomura (qualified)
  Ben Ellwood /  Dejan Petrović (second round)

Qualifiers

  Adriano Ferreira /  Gouichi Motomura
  Bobby Kokavec /  Gabriel Trifu
  Mosé Navarra /  Stefano Pescosolido

Lucky losers
  Amir Hadad /  Damien Roberts

Qualifying draw

First qualifier

Second qualifier

Third qualifier

External links

1999 Wimbledon Championships – Men's draws and results at the International Tennis Federation

Men's Doubles Qualifying
Wimbledon Championship by year – Men's doubles qualifying